The 1995 Summer Universiade, also known as the XVIII Summer Universiade, took place in Fukuoka, Japan.

Emblem
The symbol mark is a motif of "U", expressing passion and energy in the flickering flames of a burning torch. In the flames one sees both the profile of a youth and an "F", the first letter of Fukuoka.

Mascot
The mascot character for the Fukuoka Games, "Kapapoo", is a motif of a unicorn, a mythical European creature. A horse-like animal with a single horn growing from its forehead, it is said to be invincible and unrivaled for its energy. The unicorn symbolizes courage, dignity, wisdom, nobility, justice and represents the sun and heroes.

Venues
 Fukuoka Dome — ceremonies, baseball
 Hakatanomori Athletic Stadium — athletics, football
 Hakatanomori Football Stadium — football (final)
 Marine Messe — volleyball, gymnastics
 Fukuoka Prefectural Pool — swimming, diving, water polo (final)
 Hakatonomori Tennis Club Courts — tennis, water polo
 Sun Marine Stadium — baseball
 Fukuoka Kokusai Center — judo, basketball
 Accion Fukuoka — volleyball

Sports

Participants

 
 
 
 
 
 
 
 
 
 
 
 
 
 
 
 
 
 
 
 
 
 
 
 
 
 
 
 
 
 
 
 
 
 
 
 
 
 
 
 
 
 
 
 
 
 
 
 
 
 
 
 
 
 
 
 
 
 
 
 
 
 
 
 
 
 
 
 
 
 
  (host)

Medal table

External links
 Official website of the 18th Summer Universiade

 
1995
Universiade
Summer Universiade
International sports competitions hosted by Japan
Multi-sport events in Japan
Sport in Fukuoka
Summer Universiade
Summer Universiade